The Théâtre Montansier is a French theatre in rue des Réservoirs, Versailles, near the royal château.  It was created by the actress and theatre director Mademoiselle Montansier, designed by Jean-François Heurtier, inspecteur général des bâtiments du roi and designer of the Salle Favart at the Opéra-Comique. The theatre opened 18 November 1777, with Louis XVI and Marie Antoinette in attendance.

It has been headed by such figures as Marcelle Tassencourt, wife of Thierry Maulnier, and Francis Perrin.  Since 2000, it has been headed by Jean-Daniel Laval who, since taking on the role, has declared his wish to see the Théâtre Montansier opened up to a wider audience.

Bibliography
 Jacques Villard, Le théâtre Montansier à Versailles - De la Montansier à Francis Perrin, Champflour, Marly-le-Roi, 1998

External links
Official site

Theatres in France
1777 establishments in France
Buildings and structures in Versailles